Prince Alexander Davidovich Nakashidze ( (Alexandre Nakashidze)) (1837 – 25 September 1905) was a Georgian nobleman from the Gurian princely family of Nakashidze and Russian imperial general, who was responsible for several decisive victories against rebellious factions during the Caucasian War. He also participated in the Crimean and Russo-Turkish War of 1877. His son Mikhail Alexandrovich Nakashidze designed one of the world's first armoured cars that would enter military service, in Russia respectively and during the Russo-Japanese War.

Awards 
Three times Order of Saint Vladimir
Order of the White Eagle
Two times Order of Saint Anna
Three times Order of Saint Stanislaus
Two times Cross of St. George
Two times Order of the Lion and the Sun (Grand Cross Chevalier & Commander)

References 

Imperial Russian Army generals
Georgian generals in the Imperial Russian Army
Georgian generals with the rank "General of the Cavalry" (Imperial Russia)
1837 births
1905 deaths